Ancuta or Ancuța may refer to:

 Ancuța Bobocel, Romanian middle-distance runner
 Ancuța Goia, Romanian rhythmic gymnast
 Nicoleta Ancuța-Bodnar, Romanian rower
 Andrzej Ancuta, Polish cinematographer

See also 
 Anca (name)
 Ancuta, village in Chile.